Papá Youtuber is a 2019 Peruvian-Argentine comedy film directed by Fernando Villarán and written by Villarán and Gonzalo Ladines. It stars Carlos Carlín, Gianella Neyra, Pelo Madueño, Manuel Gold and Vanessa Saba. It premiered on April 11, 2019 in Peruvian theaters.

Synopsis 
Rómulo is a father of a family with little sympathy for technology who is fired by his new boss, a young millennial. Desperate not to lose his home and after finding out that his wife is pregnant, he decides to become a Youtuber, for which he will need the help of his two misunderstood children.

Cast 
The actors participating in this film are:

 Carlos Carlin as Rómulo
 Gianella Neyra as Lucía
 Thiago Bejar
 Valentina Izquierdo
 Manuel Gold
 Analía Laos as Passenger taxi
 Pelo Madueño
 Ebelín Ortiz
 Rodrigo Palacios
 Jely Reátegui
 Vanessa Saba

Production 
The filming of the film began at the end of August 2018 in the districts of Lima and Callao, and the recordings ended on September 25, 2018, after 4 weeks.

Awards

Remakes 
At the end of January 2021 it was announced that the film will have 2 remakes made in France by StudioCanal and Spain by YouthPlanet Films.

References

External links 

 
2019 films
2019 comedy films
Peruvian comedy films
Argentine comedy films
2010s Peruvian films
2010s Argentine films
2010s Spanish-language films
Films set in Peru
Films shot in Peru
Films about father–son relationships
Films about father–daughter relationships
Films about families